This Is Faron Young! is the third album by country music singer Faron Young.

Track listing

References

1959 albums
Faron Young albums